Eicochrysops sanguigutta is a butterfly in the family Lycaenidae. It is found on Madagascar and the Comoros. The habitat consists of forests.

References

Butterflies described in 1879
Eicochrysops
Butterflies of Africa
Taxa named by Paul Mabille